Robert V. Leahy (born September 5, 1946) is an American former football player and coach who has more than 35 years of coaching experience at the collegiate and professional levels. During his career, he served as the offensive coordinator at Washington State University, the University of Pittsburgh, Oklahoma State University, Liberty University, the University of Louisiana–Monroe and Grambling State University. Leahy played college football as a quarterback at Emporia State University during the late 1960s and thereafter spent two seasons with the Pittsburgh Steelers of the National Football League (NFL).

Coaching career
He was the associate head coach of the Louisiana–Monroe Warhawks football team, overseeing the program while the search for a new head coach took place.

Leahy accepted the position of offensive coordinator at Grambling State for the 2010 football season.

Broadcasting career
Currently Leahy has his own sports talk show called Coaches Corner on Talk 540 KMLB in Monroe, Louisiana. His show focuses on faith and football and any other sport topics of importance in Northeast Louisiana.

Family life
Leahy Married Susan Heitchmidt and together they have 3 children. Kristi, Jack and Joby.

References

External links
 Louisiana–Monroe profile
 

1946 births
Living people
American football quarterbacks
Buffalo Bills coaches
California Golden Bears football coaches
East Carolina Pirates football coaches
East Tennessee State Buccaneers football coaches
Emporia State Hornets football players
Grambling State Tigers football coaches
Liberty Flames football coaches
Louisiana–Monroe Warhawks football coaches
Minnesota Vikings coaches
People from Lindenhurst, New York
Pittsburgh Steelers players
Oklahoma State Cowboys football coaches
Pittsburgh Panthers football coaches
United States Football League coaches
Washington State Cougars football coaches
Sportspeople from Suffolk County, New York
Players of American football from New York (state)
Michigan Panthers